Takht-e-Nasarati is a tehsil of Karak District in Khyber Pakhtunkhwa province of Pakistan. The town of Takht-e-Nasrati is the headquarters of the tehsil. Its mountaineous area link with the Punjab.

Administration
The tehsil is administratively subdivided into  Union Councils - one of which comprises the tehsil capital, these are:
  AMBIRI KALA
 Zarki Nasrati
 Khada Banda
 Shanki Banda
 Masti Khan Banda
 Ahmad Abad 
 Chokara (Ahmad Abad, Narai Khwra, Zarkhan kala  Babul Khel, Warana, Tater Khel, Mohabathi Killa 
 Ghundi kalla
 Jehangiri 
 Hamidan
 Mianki Banda
 Shanawa Godi Khel
 Siraj Khel
 Takht-E-Nasrati
 Bogara
 Yaghi Musakan
 Niaze Khel 
 Fatha Sheri
 QamerAbad
 Khojaki Killa (Large Village)
 Shaheedan Banda
 Dagar Kala
 Marwatan Banda
 Gandri Khattak

References

Karak District
Populated places in Karak District